Holy Diver is the debut studio album by the American heavy metal band Dio, released in 1983. Vocalist Ronnie James Dio had just finished his first tenure in Black Sabbath, whose drummer, Vinny Appice, he took with him to put together his own band. The roster was completed by his former bandmate from Rainbow, Jimmy Bain, on bass and by the young guitarist Vivian Campbell, coming from the new wave of British heavy metal band Sweet Savage. The album was acclaimed by the music press and is the band's most successful effort.

History
Released on May 25, 1983, the album has been hailed by critics as Dio's best work and a classic staple in the heavy metal genre.
The album was certified gold in the US on September 12, 1984, and platinum on March 21, 1989.
In the UK it attained Silver certification (60,000 units sold) by the British Phonographic Industry, achieving this in January 1986, at the same time as The Last in Line.

The original vinyl release had a photomontage LP-liner, with images from both Rainbow and Black Sabbath days.

The album was remastered and re-released by Rock Candy Records in 2005. The only notable addition to the original album is an audio interview with Ronnie James Dio. Tracks 10–19 on the 2005 edition are Dio's answers to various questions about the album. The questions are not posed during the interview itself, but can be found inside the CD's booklet instead. The album, along with The Last in Line and Sacred Heart, were released in a new two-CD deluxe edition on March 19, 2012 through Universal for worldwide distribution outside the U.S.

"Caught in the Middle" shares the main guitar riff with Campbell's previous band Sweet Savage's song "Straight Through the Heart" (1983), whose title was used for another song in this album.

Album art
The album art is illustrated by Randy Berrett. It features the band's mascot Murray, a demonic creature, pulling or whipping a snapped metal chain and a man wearing a Catholic priest's attire flailing and splashing around in a body of water, wrapped up and locked in the other end of the broken chain. Dio was quick to argue that appearances are misleading, that it could just as easily be a priest killing a devil, wanting people not to "judge a book by its cover".

Murray is featured on several other Dio albums.

Themes
Around the time of making the album, a rise of heroic adventure elements in popular culture (such as J. R. R. Tolkien's The Lord of the Rings books and role-playing games Dungeons & Dragons) were having influence. "Much of heavy metal took place on similar turf, a realm of dark towers and impenetrable wilderness populated by battles and adversity." When Ronnie James Dio had been with Black Sabbath, "He reverently refurbished and reinvented the band's stately doom with grandiose concepts...Dio found a fertile fantasy framework for the big Sabbath themes of madness and desolation". Dio, who had read Sir Walter Scott, Arthurian tales, and science fiction growing up, had previously used fantasy lyrics in his early 1970s band Elf. He explained the influence of his youthful reading to an interviewer, saying, "When I became a songwriter, I thought what better thing to do than do what no one else is doing...to tell fantasy tales. Smartest thing I ever did."

Reception

AllMusic reviewer Eduardo Rivadavia praises the album, stating that "aside from Ronnie's unquestionably stellar songwriting, Holy Divers stunning quality and consistency owed much to his carefully chosen bandmates, including powerhouse drummer and fellow [Black] Sabbath survivor Vinny Appice, veteran bassist Jimmy Bain, and a phenomenal find in young Irish guitarist Vivian Campbell, whose tastefully pyrotechnic leads helped make this the definitive Dio lineup. Holy Diver remains the undisputed highlight of Dio's career...and, indeed, one of the finest pure heavy metal albums of the 1980s." Canadian reviewer Martin Popoff describes the album as "quintessential traditional metal", with Ronnie James Dio "almost single-handedly reinventing gothic hard rock for the '80s, incorporating strong melodic hooks and more than the genre's usual share of velvety, classical-based pyrotechnics." Kerrang! gave the album a positive review in 1983 and Holy Diver ended up at no. 5 in the British magazine's End of Year list of best releases. Today, Kerrang! still considers it a "perfect melodic metal album" and an "essential purchase".

The rock historian Ian Christe relates that for the post-Sabbath solo career "Dio simplified his stories substantially for a younger heavy metal audience. The 1983 debut Holy Diver, by his band Dio, reduced lush moral landscapes to simple good-versus-evil conflicts, using the lyrical duality of 'Rainbow in the Dark' and 'Holy Diver' to raise questions about deceit and hypocrisy in romance and religion. In the sharp contrasts of Dio's imagery, there was always a built-in contradiction that fed adolescent revolt: a black side to every white light, and a hidden secret behind every loud proclamation of truth. In a similar way, Dio's music balanced torrents of rage with brief acoustic interludes."

On IGN's list of "Top 25 Metal Albums", Holy Diver is at number 8, and this statement followed, "In all his bands, in all his roles, in all his musical vagabond choices, Ronnie James Dio has been fortunate enough to be associated with some of heavy metal's best -- Sabbath, Rainbow, and his own band Dio. To best represent his tenure in the genre, one must look no farther than Holy Diver. His first album with his new band was also his best. It is one of metal's best albums, and it spawned two of the greatest metal songs of the '80s: 'Holy Diver' and 'Rainbow in the Dark'. Featuring the underrated Vivian Campbell on guitar, this album showed that Dio could do it on his own." In 2017, it was ranked 16th on Rolling Stone list of "100 Greatest Metal Albums of All Time".

Track listing

Original release

Deluxe edition

Personnel
Dio
Ronnie James Dio – vocals, keyboards, production
Vinny Appice – drums
Jimmy Bain – bass, keyboards
Vivian Campbell – guitar

Production
 Engineered by Angelo Arcuri, assisted by Ray Leonard
 Recorded at Sound City, Los Angeles
 Mastered by George Marino at Sterling Sound, New York
 Remastered by Gary Moore at Universal Digital Mastering, London (2005 Rock Candy reissue)
 Remastered by Andy Pearce (2012 Universal Deluxe Edition)
 Remastered by Steve Hoffman (2012 Audio Fidelity 24K edition)
 Illustration by Randy Barrett
 Original art rendering by Gene Hunter
 Original concept by Wendy Dio

Charts

Certifications

See also
Holy Diver – Live

References

External links 
 
 
 

1983 debut albums
Dio (band) albums
Warner Records albums
Vertigo Records albums
Mercury Records albums
Albums recorded at Sound City Studios